The Chaokai railway is a  freight-only railway line of the China Railway in Jilin, connecting Chaoyangchuan on the Changtu Railway with Kaishantun. The line formerly crossed the Tumen River to reach Sambong in modern-day North Korea, but the bridge has since had the tracks removed, and is in use as a road crossing.

History
In 1917, the Chosen Government Railway's (Sentetsu) Hamgyeong Line reached Hoeryeong. Soon afterwards the Domun Railway began construction of its mainline from Hoeryeong to Donggwanjin, reaching Sambong (then called Sangsambong) in 1920, Jongseon in 1922 and finally Donggwanjin in 1924. The narrow-gauge Tiantu Railway, opened in 1923, signed a cross-border operational agreement with the Domun Railway on 26 June 1926, after which a bridge across the Tumen River between Sangsambong and Kaishantun was opened on 30 September 1927. In 1929 the Domun Railway was nationalised and absorbed by Sentetsu, and on 1 August 1933, Sentetsu's new line from the port at Unggi to Hoeryoeng was completed. In the same year, the Manchukuo National Railway ("MNR") completed its Jingtu Line from Xinjing (now Changchun), the capital of Manchukuo, to Tumen.

In October 1933, the South Manchuria Railway (Mantetsu) took over management of Sentetsu's entire line from Ch'ŏngjin to Unggi, and at that time, the Hoeryŏng–Sangsambong section was added to the existing (Wŏnsan–Ch'ŏngjin) Hamgyŏng Line, the Sambong–Namyang section was renamed the North Chosen West Line (Puksŏn-sŏbusŏn), and the Namyang–Unggi section was renamed North Chosen East Line (Puksŏn-tongbusŏn). Connecting the Jingtu Line with the North Chosen East Line would create a short, direct route from Japan to Xinjing and Harbin, and so National Railway bought the Tiantu Railway in 1933.

The MNR began work on the Chaokai Line in 1933, regauging the Tiantu Railway's line from  narrow gauge to standard gauge and making a shorter, more direct line from Kaishantun to Chaoyangchuan on the Jingtu Line, opening the new line for use at the end of March 1934. The line at once became a very important link between Japan and the Asian mainland via the Korean port of Rajin.

In 1940 there were seven passenger trains between Chaoyangchuan and Sambong and eight from Sambong to Chaoyanghcuan, with a second-class ticket for the full distance costing 1 Manchukuo yuan 8 chiao 3 fen, and a third-class ticket costing 1 yuan 1 chiao. Travel time ranged from as short as 3 hours (Train 1220, leaving Sambong at 9:55 am and arriving at Chaoyangchuan at 2:05 pm), to as long as 4 hours 5 minutes (Train 1222, leaving Sambong at 4:40 pm and arriving at Chaoyangchuan at 8:45 pm). There were also several trains over shorter relations, including Chaoyangchuan–Badaohe and Chaoyangchuan–Longjing. Two KiHa-3 class railcars were assigned to passenger services on this line.

By the time the last timetable was issued prior to the start of the Pacific War in November 1942, service on the line had been cut back to three return trips between Chaoyangchuan and Sambong – one each in the morning, afternoon, and evening. These were still operated by 3rd class railcar.

Route

References

 

Railway lines in China
Railway lines in North Korea
Standard gauge railways in China
Railway lines in Manchukuo
Railway lines opened in 1927